Vertigo modesta, common name the cross vertigo, is a species of minute air-breathing land snail, a terrestrial pulmonate gastropod mollusk or micromollusk in the family Vertiginidae, the whorl snails. 

Subspecies
 Vertigo modesta castanea Pilsbry & Vanatta, 1900
 Vertigo modesta concinnula Cockerell, 1897
 Vertigo modesta modesta (Say, 1824)

Description
(Described as  Isthmia corpulenta) The shell is rimate perforate, elongate ovate, finely striated, polished, translucent, dark olive brown. The apex is round and obtuse. The shell contains four whorls, convex, tumid, wider at the base. The aperture is large, subcircular, with four obtuse teeth, one on the parietal margin, one on the columellar margin, and two on the outer lip. The peristome is slightly thickened and reflected.

Distribution
This species is known to occur in a number of countries and islands including:

 Texas, USA.
 Utah, USA
 Great Britain
 and other areas

References

 Gould, A. A. (1847). [Description] of a new species of Physa, together with two other new species of North American shells. Proceedings of the Boston Society of Natural History. 2: 262-263.
 Ancey, C. F. (1887). Description of North American shells. The Conchologists' Exchange. 2(6): 79-80.
 Bank, R. A.; Neubert, E. (2017). Checklist of the land and freshwater Gastropoda of Europe. Last update: July 16th, 2017.
 Sysoev, A. V. & Schileyko, A. A. (2009). Land snails and slugs of Russia and adjacent countries. Sofia/Moskva (Pensoft). 312 pp., 142 plates.

External links
 Some info at:  
 Say, T. (1824). Class Mollusca. In: Narrative of an expedition to the source of St. Peter's River, Lake Winnepeek, Lake of the Woods, &c. &c. performed in the year 1823, by order of The Hon. J.C. Calhoun, Secretary of War, under the command of Stephen H. Long, Major U. S. T. E. compiled from the notes of Major Long, Messrs Say, Keating, and Calhoun, by William H. Keating, A. M. &c. H.C. Carey & I. Lea, Philadelphia. 2: 256-266, plates 14-15
 Sterki, V. (1892). Preliminary list of North American Pupidae (north of Mexico). The Nautilus. 6(1): 2-8.
 Pilsbry, H. A.; Cooke, C. M. (1918-1920). Manual of conchology, structural and systematic, with illustrations of the species. Ser. 2, Pulmonata. Vol. 25: Pupillidae (Gastrocoptinae, Vertigininae). pp i-ix, 1-404, pls 1-34. Philadelphia, published by the Conchological Section, Academy of Natural Sciences.
 Berry, S. S. (1919). Three new alpine vertigos from California. The Nautilus. 33(2): 48-52
 Möller, H. P. C. (1842). Index Molluscorum Groenlandiae. Naturhistorisk Tidsskrift. 4: 76-97 (Copenhagen).
 Morelet, A. (1858). Coquilles terrestres du Kamtchatka. Journal de conchyliologie. 7 (1): 7-22
 Schileyko, A. A. & Rymzhanov, T. S. (2013). Fauna of land mollusks (Gastropoda, Pulmonata Terrestria) of Kazakhstan and adjacent territories. Moscow-Almaty: KMK Scientific Press. 389 pp

modesta
Gastropods described in 1824